Vriesea billbergioides is a plant species in the genus Vriesea. This species is endemic to Brazil.

References

billbergioides
Flora of Brazil